The National Theater is a historic theater in Richmond, Virginia. Part of a city block along the 700 block of Broad Street once known as Theatre Row, it is the only surviving auditorium of the row (the others now exist in facade only).

The National Theater was built in 1923, originally staging both live entertainment (such as vaudeville shows) as well as motion-pictures. In 1968, it was converted into a dedicated cinema, which closed on September 5, 1983.

Restored and reopened in 2008 by RIC Capital Ventures, the theater, operating as The National, is used as a performing arts and music venue. In 2014, the venue was acquired by AEG Live.

It was added to the National Register of Historic Places in 2003 and is located in the Grace Street Commercial Historic District.

References

External links

Official website

National Register of Historic Places in Richmond, Virginia
Renaissance Revival architecture in Virginia
Theatres completed in 1923
Theatres on the National Register of Historic Places in Virginia
1923 establishments in Virginia
Individually listed contributing properties to historic districts on the National Register in Virginia